Dough is a thick, malleable, sometimes elastic paste made from grains or from leguminous or chestnut crops. Dough is typically made by mixing flour with a small amount of water or other liquid and sometimes includes yeast or other leavening agents, as well as ingredients such as fats or flavorings.

Making and shaping dough begins the preparation of a wide variety of foodstuffs, particularly breads and bread-based items, but also including biscuits, cakes, cookies, dumplings, flatbreads, noodles, pasta, pastry, pizza, piecrusts, and similar items. Dough can be made from a wide variety of flour, commonly wheat and rye but also maize, rice, legumes, almonds, and other cereals or crops.

Types of dough

Doughs vary widely depending on ingredients, the desired end product, the leavening agent (particularly whether the dough is based on yeast or not), how the dough is mixed (whether quickly mixed or kneaded and left to rise), and cooking or baking technique. There is no formal definition of what makes dough, though most doughs have viscoelastic properties.

There are several general classes of dough:

Yeast-leavened or fermented doughs, made from cereal grains or ground legumes mixed with water and yeast, are used all over the world to make various types of bread including bread rolls, loaves and flatbread. The addition of salt, oil or other fats, sugar or honey and sometimes milk or eggs will produce bread products of varying texture. Commercial bread dough may also include dough conditioners, which help make the dough and the final product more consistent.

Doughs with higher fat content that contain less water develop less gluten and are therefore generally less elastic than bread doughs. They tend to become tough when they are kneaded These doughs are often called "short" by bakers. Examples include many cookie and pie doughs such as shortcrust pastry. 

Quick breads use leavening agents other than yeast (such as baking powder or baking soda), and include most cookies, cakes, biscuits, and more. These may be based on a batter or a dough.

Laminated dough such as mille-feuille and puff pastry where a prepared flour dough is folded over fat (usually butter) and rolled out. The folding and rolling process can be repeated to create very thin layers of dough and butter to create the puff pastry. There are many different techniques to create laminated doughs and some like paratha are relatively simple while others like mille-feuille are more laborious. Most laminated doughs are leavened only by the steam created by the folding process. Danish pastry and croissant are sometimes considered a separate class of dough because they are made from laminated dough that is leavened with yeast.

Choux pastry is a steam-leavened dough used for some types of sweet pastries, notably cream puffs, eclairs, tulumba and churros. Unlike most other pastry doughs, the ingredients for the dough are cooked on the stovetop before the dough is baked until achieving the consistency of a thick paste. Choux means cabbage in French. It's thought that the name comes from the shape of the cream puffs made with choux paste.

Some dumpling and pasta doughs are similar enough that experts have difficulty distinguishing them, although dumpling is a very general category that overlaps with others like yeasted breads and batter biscuits. Varying the ratio of liquid and flour in a basic pasta dough may create a softer dough like that used for the German soup noodle spaetzle. Eggs are a very common addition to make the dough moist and easier to roll out. The dough can be filled or shaped various ways and boiled, baked, steamed or fried.

Gluten free doughs like rice noodles and Japanese harusame noodles depend on the gelatinzation of starch for structure.

Unleavened bread is made not only from wheat but in many cultures has been made from locally available starchy ingredients like corn, oatcakes and casabe de yuca since the earliest times. 

Sometimes meringue is considered a dough. The English recipe for "Satan Biscuit" dates to 1677, and earlier recipes are known by different names. Some included flour like a 1604 recipe for "white bisket bread".

Techniques 
Techniques used in dough production depend on the type of dough and final product.

For yeast-based and sponge (such as sourdough) breads, a common production technique is the dough is mixed, kneaded, and then left to rise. Many bread doughs call for a second stage, where the dough is kneaded again, shaped into the final form, and left to rise a final time (or proofed) before baking. Kneading is the process of working a dough to produce a smooth, elastic dough by developing gluten. This process is both temperature and time-dependent; temperatures that are either too hot or too cold will cause the yeast to not develop, and rising times that are either too short or too long will affect the final product.

Pasta is typically made from a dry dough that is kneaded and shaped, either through extrusion, rolling out in a pasta machine, or stretched or shaped by hand (as for gnocchi or dumplings). Pasta may be cooked directly after production (so-called "fresh pasta") or dried, which renders it shelf-stable.

Doughs for biscuits and many flatbreads which are not leavened with yeast are typically mixed but not kneaded or left to rise; these doughs are shaped and cooked directly after mixing.

While breads and other products made from doughs are often baked, some types of dough-based foods are cooked over direct heat, such as tortillas, which are cooked directly on a griddle. Fried dough foods are also common in many cultures.

Pancakes, waffles, some kinds of bar cookies such as brownies, and many cakes and quick breads (including muffins and the like) are often made with a semi-liquid batter of flour and liquid that is poured into the final shape, rather than a solid dough. Unlike bread dough, these batters are not stabilized by the formation of a gluten network.

See also 

 Baking 
 Bread trough
 Dough blender
 Dough scraper
 Doughboy (disambiguation)
 Farinograph – a tool that measures specific properties of flour
 List of breads
 List of fried dough foods 
 List of pasta
 List of pastries 
 Parchment paper
 Proofing (baking technique)
 Roller docker
 Royal icing
 Straight dough
 Stuffing

References

Further reading
 —covers commercial dough production
 —covers home and commercial baking and dough techniques
 —covers home and commercial baking and dough techniques

External links